Thomas Rake Jr. ( 1949 – July 5, 2007) was an American football coach.  He was the head football coach at Framingham State University, a position he held from 1985 to 1994.

Raeke was an assistant on the staff of head coach Tom Kelley for two seasons before being promoted to head coach at Framingham State. At the time of his death, his 1986 squad, which finished with a record of 6 wins and 4 losses, was the last winning season at Framingham. They did not have another season above .500 until 2010.

Head coaching record

Notes

References

2007 deaths
Framingham State Rams football coaches